The fourth USS Seneca (SP-1240) was a United States Navy barge in commission from 1917 to 1919.

Seneca was built as a non-self-propelled commercial schooner barge of the same name in 1884 by Delaware River Iron Ship Building and Engine Works at Chester, Pennsylvania. On 18 October 1917, the U.S. Navy purchased her from the Luckenbach Steamship Company for use during World War I. Assigned the section patrol number SP-1240, she was commissioned in 1917 as USS Seneca (SP-1240).

Seneca first served as a coal barge for the Minesweeping Division at Tompkinsville, Staten Island, New York. In January 1918, she moved to Providence, Rhode Island, and she spent the last months of World War I as a floating base at Shelburne, Nova Scotia, Canada.

In February 1919, Seneca relieved the submarine tender  as temporary tender for Submarine Division 5, and served as such, primarily as an accommodation ship, at Philadelphia, Pennsylvania, from 4 March to 28 May 1919 and at Norfolk, Virginia, from 29 May 1919 until detached on 29 August 1919.

Seneca was ordered sold on 10 September 1919 and was delivered to her purchaser, the Neptune Line of New York City, on 1 October 1919.

Seneca should not be confused with the minesweeper and patrol vessel , which was in commission at the same time.

References

Department of the Navy Naval History and Heritage Command Online Library of Selected Images: Civilian Ships: Seneca (American Schooner Barge, 1884). Served as USS Seneca (SP-1240) in 1917-1919
NavSource Online: Section Patrol Craft Photo Archive: Seneca (SP 1240)

Auxiliary ships of the United States Navy
World War I auxiliary ships of the United States
Schooner barges
1884 ships
Schooners of the United States Navy
Ships built by the Delaware River Iron Ship Building and Engine Works
Barges of the United States Navy